Sahydroaraneus is a genus of spiders in the family Theraphosidae. It was first described in 2014 by Mirza & Sanap. , it contains 4 species, all in India.

References

Theraphosidae
Theraphosidae genera
Spiders of the Indian subcontinent